Recurvidris browni is a species of ant of the subfamily Myrmicinae, which can be found from Indonesia (Kalimantan), Malaysia (Sarawak and West Malaysia) and Thailand. The size of the ant is about 2.502.60 mm. Its body colour is yellow.

References

External links

 at antwiki.org
Animaldiversity.org
Itis.org

Myrmicinae
Hymenoptera of Asia
Insects described in 1992